is a mountain in Hyōgo Prefecture, Japan. The source of the Ibo River is located on the south side of the mountain.

References 

Mountains of Hyōgo Prefecture